The Copa Nuevos Valores (Spanish for "New Values Cup") was a professional wrestling tournament promoted by the Mexican lucha libre promotion Consejo Mundial de Lucha Libre (CMLL) held between April 3 and April 17, 2018 at Arena México. The tournament was held to give prominence to 16 younger, lower ranked wrestlers who worked for CMLL at the time. As a professional wrestling tournament it was won not by actual competition, but by a scripted ending to a match.

The final match saw Magia Blanca defeat Flyer to win the tournament and earn a match for the Mexican National Welterweight Championship held by Soberano Jr. at the time. The tournament also included Astral, El Coyote, Fugaz, Grako, Jorge Kebrada, Maquiavelo, Príncipe Daniel, Príncipe Diamante, Príncipe Odin Jr., Retro, Reyko, Sangre Imperial, Súper Astro Jr. and Yago.

History
The Mexican professional wrestling company Consejo Mundial de Lucha Libre (Spanish for "World Wrestling Council"; CMLL for short) has a long history of promoting tournaments focusing on the younger or lower ranked wrestlers on their rosters, primarily as a means to showcase select wrestlers in an attempt to elevate one or more wrestlers up the ranks of CMLL. In 1994 CMLL introduced the Gran Alternativa ("The Great Alternative") tournament, a tag team tournament where a relative rookie would team up with a veteran wrestler for a tournament. The tournament concept was so successful that it became an annual event on CMLL's event calendar from that point forward.

In 1996 CMLL introduced La Copa Junior, a tournament for second or third-generation wrestlers, often lower ranked, again to showcase at least one of the competitors in the tournament. The La Copa Junior has been held intermittently since 1996 although not on an annual schedule. In 2014 CMLL held both a regular version of La Copa Junior, and a "VIP" version focusing more on well established second-generation wrestlers, distinguishing itself from the tournament that focuses on younger wrestlers. In 2011 CMLL held the Forjando un Ídolo ("Forging an Idol") tournament, featuring 16 low-to-mid card wrestlers competing in the tournament. The tournament was won by Ángel de Oro and signaled his ascent up the ranks of CMLL. In both 2012 and 2013 CMLL held the Torneo Sangre Nueva (literally "the New Blood Tournament"), featuring younger, lower ranked wrestlers in the traditional tournament format. In early 2018 CMLL decided to hold a new tournament focusing on their lower ranked or younger competitors called the Torneo Nuevos Valores ("New Values Cup") featuring 16 competitors who had yet to get many opportunities in CMLL, in a three-week long tournament. Audaz and Templario were originally announced for the tournament, but were replaced by Astral and Príncipe Odin Jr. later on without any explanation.

Tournament
The tournament featured 15 professional wrestling matches spread out over three shows. The tournament format followed CMLL's traditional tournament formats, with two qualifying blocks of eight wrestlers that competed during the first and second week of the tournament and a final match between the two block winners. The qualifying blocks were all one-fall matches while the tournament final was a best two-out-of-three-falls match.

Tournament participants

Tournament brackets

Tournament shows

April 3, 2018

April 10, 2018

April 17, 2018

Aftermath
As a result of winning the tournament, Magia Blanca was awarded a championship match in his weight division. On May 1, 2018, Magia Blanca wrestled Soberano Jr. for the Mexican National Welterweight Championship but lost two falls to one. The two finalists, Magica Blanca and Flyer, faced off in CMLL's next tournament, the Gran Alternativa tournament, where Flyer gained a measure of revenge and he and Volador Jr. defeated Magia Blanca and Atlantis from the tournament. On May 24 it was revealed that Magia Blanca had suffered a knee injury during a match and would not be able to work for six to nine months.

References

2018 in professional wrestling
Consejo Mundial de Lucha Libre tournaments
2018 in Mexico